The  was a short-lived separatist state established in 1869 on the island of Ezo, now Hokkaido, by a part of the former military of the Tokugawa shogunate at the end of the Bakumatsu period in Japan. It was the first government to attempt to institute democracy in Japan, though voting was allowed only to the samurai caste. The Republic of Ezo existed for five months before being annexed by the newly established Empire of Japan.

Background

After the overthrow of the Tokugawa shogunate (bakufu) in the Boshin War by the Meiji Restoration, a part of the former shōguns navy, led by Admiral Enomoto Takeaki, retreated from the capital Edo (Tokyo) in October 1868, sailing north to continue the fight against the advancing Imperial army. Along with Enomoto were many other former Tokugawa officers, including the Commander-in-Chief of the shogunate's army, Matsudaira Tarō, and French officers Jules Brunet and André Cazeneuve, former members of a military training mission to Japan, who had refused to leave the country after being recalled to France in late September.

Shortly before midnight on 4 October, the ships left the port of Shinagawa in Tokyo Bay. Enomoto's fleet consisted of four warships (Kaiyō maru (flagship), Kaiten maru, Banryū maru and Chiyodagata maru) and four transport ships (Kanrin maru, Shinsoku maru, Chōgei maru and Mikaho maru).

The fleet first arrived in Sendai, where they were joined by three more French defectors, Arthur Fortant, François Bouffier and Jean Marlin. Enomoto's goal was to gather military support from the clans of the disbanded Ōuetsu Reppan Dōmei (also known as "Northern Alliance"), but this ended in failure after a major clan defected to the Imperial side. After one month in Sendai the fleet sailed further north, arriving in Hakodate, Ezo, on 3 December, which was captured five days later by a force of 4,000 shogunate troops.

With support from the French advisers led by Brunet, Enomoto's army continued the conquest of Ezo, capturing Matsumae Castle (18 December) and Esashi (28 December), and by the end of the year the region was under full control of the rebels. Enomoto made a last effort to petition the Imperial Court to be allowed to develop Hokkaido and maintain the traditions of the samurai unmolested, but his request was denied.

History

On January 27, 1869, the independent "Republic of Ezo" was proclaimed, with its government structure based on the United States. Suffrage was limited to the samurai class. Votes were cast through open ballots and resulted in the election of Enomoto Takeaki as sosai, an office variously translated as president or director-general, and Matsudaira Tarō as fuku-sosai (vice-president or assistant governor-general). Some cabinet members were elected by the troops as well; Arai Ikunosuke was chosen as kaigun-bugyō (Navy minister) and Ōtori Keisuke as rikugun-bugyō (Army minister). This was the first election ever held in Japan, where a feudal structure under an Emperor with military warlords was the norm. Through Hakodate magistrate Nagai Naoyuki, attempts were made to reach out to foreign legations present in Hakodate to obtain international diplomatic recognition.

On the same day, a celebration of the Ezo territory all-island settlement (Ezo territory declaration ceremony) was held, proclaiming the establishment of a provisional government with Enomoto as president.

The treasury included 180,000 gold ryō coins Enomoto retrieved from Osaka Castle following shōgun Tokugawa Yoshinobu's precipitous departure after the Battle of Toba–Fushimi in early 1868.

During the winter of 1868–1869, the defences around the southern peninsula of Hakodate were enhanced, with the star fortress of Goryōkaku at the centre. The land force was organised under a joint Franco-Japanese command, commander-in-chief Ōtori Keisuke being seconded by the French captain Jules Brunet. The troops were divided into four brigades, each commanded by a French officer (Fortant, Marlin, Cazeneuve and Bouffier). Each brigade was in turn divided into two battalions, and these into four companies.

Brunet demanded (and received) a signed personal pledge of loyalty from all officers and insisted they assimilate French ideas. An anonymous French officer wrote that Brunet had taken charge of everything:

Defeat by Imperial forces and aftermath

Imperial troops soon consolidated their hold on mainland Japan, and in April 1869 dispatched a fleet and an infantry force of 7,000 men to Hokkaido. The Imperial forces progressed swiftly, won the Battle of Hakodate, and surrounded the fortress at Goryōkaku. Enomoto surrendered on June 26, 1869, turning the Goryōkaku over to Satsuma staff officer Kuroda Kiyotaka on June 27, 1869. Kuroda is said to have been deeply impressed by Enomoto's dedication in combat and is remembered as the one who spared the latter's life from execution. On September 20 of the same year, the island was given its present name, Hokkaido (Hokkaidō, literally "Northern Sea Region").

Enomoto was sentenced to a brief prison sentence, but was freed in 1872 and accepted a post as a government official in the newly renamed Hokkaido Land Agency. He later became ambassador to Russia and held several ministerial positions in the Meiji Government.

The rebels' French allies, some of them wounded, sailed from Hakodate on 9 June aboard the French vessel Coëtlogon to Yokohama, where Cazeneuve was admitted to the local naval hospital. Their leader Jules Brunet returned to France in September 1869. He was suspended from active duty in the French army in October, and was later put on trial but received only a light sentence of minor loss in seniority. In February 1870 Brunet was recalled to service, and back as a captain fought in the Franco-Prussian War later that year. In 1871, Arthur Fortant, Jean Marlin, and François Bouffier signed an employment contract with professor Harada Ichido (father of Harada Naojirō) and returned to Japan as civilians to teach at the military school of Osaka.

Perspectives

Thus from Enomoto's perspective, the efforts to establish a government in Hokkaido were not only for the sake of providing for the Tokugawa clan on the one hand (burdened as it was with an enormous amount of redundant retainers and employees) but also as developing Ezo for the sake of defence for the rest of Japan, something which had been a topic of concern for some time. Recent scholarship has noted that for centuries, Ezo was not considered a part of Japan the same way that the other "main" islands of modern Japan were, so the creation of the Ezo Republic, in a contemporary mindset, was not an act of secession, but rather of "bringing" the sociopolitical entity of "Japan" formally to Ezo.

Notes

References
Ballard C. B., Vice-Admiral G.A. The Influence of the Sea on the Political History of Japan. London: John Murray, 1921.
Black, John R. Young Japan: Yokohama and Yedo, Vol. II. London: Trubner & Co., 1881.

Sims, Richard. French Policy towards the Bakufu and Meiji Japan 1854–1895, Richmond: Japan Library, 1998.
Suzuki, Tessa Morris. Re-Inventing Japan: Time Space Nation. New York: M. E. Sharpe, 1998.
Yamaguchi, Ken. Kinsé shiriaku A history of Japan, from the first visit of Commodore Perry in 1853 to the capture of Hakodate by the Mikado's forces in 1869. Trans. Sir Ernest Satow. Wilmington, Del., Scholarly Resources, 1973.

External links

History of Hokkaido
Meiji Restoration
Boshin War
1868 in Japan
1869 in Japan
Former countries in East Asia
Ezo
Island countries
1869 establishments in Japan
1869 disestablishments in Japan
Ezo, Republic of
Ezo, Republic of
Samurai